The Prank is a 2022 American comedy horror film directed by Maureen Bharoocha and written by Rebecca Flinn-White and Zak White. It stars Rita Moreno, Connor Kalopsis, and Ramona Young. The plot follows two students who falsely accuse their teacher of murder because she threatened to fail them. The film premiered at South by Southwest on March 13, 2022.

Premise
Ben needs good grades to earn a scholarship. His widowed mother Julie is unable to pay for his college tuition. In school, his physics teacher Mrs. Wheeler threatens to fail the entire class after she discovers that someone cheated on the midterm exam. Frustrated, Ben and his best friend Tanner come up with a plan to falsely accuse Mrs. Wheeler of the murder of a missing student.

Cast

 Rita Moreno as Mrs. Wheeler, a physics teacher
 Connor Kalopsis as Ben, a high school student
 Ramona Young as Tanner, Ben's best friend
 Keith David as Principal Henderson. David based his performance on the fictional character Theodore J. Mooney.
 Kate Flannery as a school cafeteria lunch lady
 Meredith Salenger as Julie, Ben's mother
 Jonathan Kimmel as Joe
 Nathan Janak as Phillip, a student who reports everything on social media 
 Betsy Sodaro
 Romel De Silva as Sawyer Friedman, a nerdy student in Mrs. Wheeler's class

Production
The Prank was announced on August 9, 2021, when it was reported that EGOT winner Rita Moreno would star alongside Connor Kalopsis, Ramona Young, Keith David, Meredith Salenger, Jonathan Kimmel, Nathan Janak, and Kate Flannery. Filming began in Los Angeles in August 2021.

Release
The film premiered at the South by Southwest film festival on March 13, 2022.

Reception

Todd McCarthy at Deadline Hollywood criticized the performances, screenplay, and direction, calling it "unspeakably lame" and writing, "If you go to see this, The Pranks on you." The Hollywood Reporters David Rooney noted its inconsistent tone, the chemistry between Kalopsis and Young, and Moreno's performance. Writing for Variety, Owen Gleiberman complimented Moreno's performance and the beginning, which he compared to the "good parts" of Don't Look Up, for starting "off as a fresh, funny riff on high-school society in the age of toxic cynicism". However, he criticized the twist for leaving "any true connection to the real world behind." In a positive review, Alexandra Heller-Nicholas of the Alliance of Women Film Journalists said some viewers would call it over-the-top, but that it was a "wild ride" that "puts the casual cruelty of youth in its crosshairs."

References

External links
 

American comedy horror films
American films about revenge
Films about murder
Films about scandalous teacher–student relationships
Films set in schools
Films shot in Los Angeles
2020s English-language films
2020s American films